Rookie of the Year is an indie rock/acoustic band from Fayetteville, North Carolina. They were signed to One Eleven Records, though their third release fulfilled their contractual obligation to One Eleven and allowed them to sign with a new label. The band is fronted by lead singer/songwriter Ryan Dunson.

Biography 

The band was formed in 2005 as a solo project of singer Ryan Dunson. Dunson signed with Vice Verse Virtue Records, a Tennessee record label, in late 2005. Soon after, Dunson signed to One Eleven Records, releasing a 1000-copy EP called Late Night Makeout. In 2005 One Eleven Records released the band's first record, Having to Let Go, as a 13-track LP. In 2005, OneEleven Records re-released the album as a 10-track LP. After expanding to a five-piece, their second album, The Goodnight Moon, was released in April 2006 to critical acclaim and widespread fan approval. Following this release, they toured through North America on the Warped Tour.

March in 2008 Mick Parsons from the Tooth and Nail records band Jonezetta joined band on Drums.  

Their full-length record Sweet Attention was released on August 5, 2008 on One Eleven Records.  Over the next 12 months, the band toured non-stop promoting the release, including two headlining tours as well as a prominent tour supporting reunited boy-band LFO. The band would do multiple tours with Secondhand Serenade, playing as Secondhand Serenade’s live band if needed.

In June 2010 they released an 8-track EP titled The Most Beautiful, featuring the singles "Turn the Page" and "Frustrated".

David Whitney, (drummer)  was killed in a car accident on July 4, 2011.

January 11, 2012, Rookie of the Year release an Acoustic/EP called Along for the Ride featuring the song "Dallas".

Rookie Of The Year officially release Canova Presents: The Goodnight Moon Part II' Featuring the singles: "Love/Me/Crazy", "Save Me" and "Colors of Summer". 

In early 2017, it was announced that Rookie Of The Year would be touring as a full band for the first time since 2011. The band completed a 6-week national comeback tour which included headline dates and support dates with Forever The Sickest Kids, He Is We, For The Win, and The New Low.

Rookie signed to Cardigan Records in April 2018 to Release a covers Ep. In late 2018, the band toured in celebration of the 10 year anniversary of Sweet Attention, completed another headlining tour, and toured as direct support for Tooth & Nail Records' MAE, with additional support from LOYALS.

In 2021, the band entered the studio with Matt Squire.  New album is hinted to be done

Discography

Albums
 Having to Let Go (2005)
 The Goodnight Moon (April 11, 2006, 111 Records)
 Sweet Attention (August 5, 2008, 111 Records) U.S. Billboard Heatseekers No. 11 and No. 9 on Billboard's Alternative New Artist chart.
 The Most Beautiful (June 7, 2010, Future Destination Records)
 The Goodnight Moon Part II'' (August 13, 2013, Future Destination Records distro)

EPs
  Since I Left Your World (2009, 111 Records)
  Along For The Ride (January 11, 2012)

Band members 
Ryan Dunson - Lead Vocals, Guitar
Trey Mulvey - Guitar/ Vocals
Chris Moropoulos - Drums
Stevie Benz - Bass/Vocals

Former Live Members
Mike Kamerman - 2005-2010 (Guitar, Vocals)
Brandon Schade - 2006-2009 (Guitar)
David Whitney - 2007 (Drums)
TJ Holt - 2004-2006 (Drums)
Mick Parsons - 2007-2008 (Drums)
Jordan Young - 2009-2010 (Drums)
Vito Apollo - 2007-2009 (Keyboards)
Daniel Kerrigan - 2009 (Keyboards/Guitar)
Zack Reichert - 2009-2010 (Guitar)
Joshua Duncan - 2014-2015 (Saxophone/Back-up vocalist)
Jeff Nations - 2017-2019 (Drums, Percussion, Background Vocals)
Adam Wirth - 2017-2019 (Bass, Background Vocals)

Music videos 
 Liars and Battlelines (2007)
 What Is Love (2008)
 Sooner or Later (The Next Move) (2009)
 Slow Down (2009)
 Hey Lauren (2010)
 Wake me up (it's Christmas) (2010)
 Dallas (2012)
 Everything (2017)
 Empty House (2018)

References

Musical groups established in 2002
Musical groups from North Carolina
American emo musical groups
2002 establishments in North Carolina